Beggarington, also known as Beggerington and Begerington is a hamlet consisting of a few houses about  north of Hartshead in Kirklees, West Yorkshire. It is situated in a bend of the B6119 road at the junction with the road from Roberttown. Beggerington has traditionally been considered a part of Hartshead. The place name means either "where the berries grow" or is related to beggar.

A coal mine was recorded here in the 19th century as "Beggarington Pit, Hartshead".

A waste water treatment works named Beggarington is located off Green Lane, a public bridleway.

References

External links
 
 

Hamlets in West Yorkshire
Geography of Kirklees